Weasel Collar Glacier is in Glacier National Park, U.S. state of Montana. The glacier is in a cirque and the terminus faces to the north. Between 1966 and 2005, Weasel Collar Glacier had the least amount of glacial ice lost of any glacier in Glacier National Park, losing only 6.7 percent of its surface area.

References

See also
 List of glaciers in the United States
 Glaciers in Glacier National Park (U.S.)

Glaciers of Flathead County, Montana
Glaciers of Glacier National Park (U.S.)
Glaciers of Montana